The name Blanca has been used for eleven tropical cyclones in the Eastern Pacific Ocean.

 Hurricane Blanca (1966), never affected land, travelled 4,300 miles during its lifetime.
 Tropical Storm Blanca (1970), did not make landfall.
 Tropical Storm Blanca (1974), did not make landfall.
 Tropical Storm Blanca (1979), did not make landfall.
 Hurricane Blanca (1985), did not affect any land.
 Tropical Storm Blanca (1991), did not cause any casualties or damages.
 Tropical Storm Blanca (1997), did not cause any major damage or casualties.
 Tropical Storm Blanca (2003), did not have any effects on land.
 Tropical Storm Blanca (2009), did not make landfall, but contributed to flooding in Mexico.
 Hurricane Blanca (2015), Category 4 hurricane, made landfall in the Baja California Peninsula as a tropical storm.
 Tropical Storm Blanca (2021), did not affect any land.

Pacific hurricane set index articles